Following are the statistics of the Libyan Premier League for the 2000–01 season.  The Libyan Premier League is the highest division of Libyan football championship, organised by Libyan Football Federation.  It was founded in 1963 and features mostly professional players.

Overview
It was contested by 14 teams, and Al Madina Tripoli won the championship.

Final
Al Madina Tripoli 1-1 Al Tahaddy Benghazi
Al Madina Tripoli won on PK

References
Libya - List of final tables (RSSSF)

Libyan Premier League seasons
1
Libyan Premier League